This page lists the winners and nominees for the Soul Train Music Rhythm & Bars Award. Originally titled Best Hip-Hop Song of the Year, the award has been given since the 2010 ceremony. It was renamed to its current title in 2016. Cardi B and Drake are the acts with the most wins in this category, both winning twice.

Winners and nominees
Winners are listed first and highlighted in bold.

2010s

2020s

See also
 Soul Train Music Award for Best Song of the Year

References

Soul Train Music Awards
Song awards